Ulmus × hollandica 'Wentworthii Pendula' (in continental Europe also spelled 'Wendworthii Pendula'), commonly known as the Wentworth Elm or Wentworth Weeping Elm, is a cultivar with a distinctive weeping habit that appears to have been introduced to cultivation towards the end of the 19th century. The tree is not mentioned in either Elwes and Henry's or Bean's classic works on British trees. The earliest known references are Dutch and German, the first by de Vos in Handboek tot de praktische kennis der voornaamste boomen (1890). At about the same time, the tree was offered for sale by the Späth nursery of Berlin as Ulmus Wentworthi pendula Hort. (see Etymology). The 'Hort.' in Späth's 1890 catalogue, without his customary label "new", confirms that the tree was by then in nurseries as a horticultural elm. De Vos, writing in 1889, states that the Supplement to Volume 1 includes entries announced since the main volume in 1887, putting the date of introduction between 1887 and 1889. 

De Vos suggested that the tree was a form of Ulmus × hollandica, a view accepted in the Ulmus names lists of Royal Botanic Gardens, Kew and Royal Botanic Garden Edinburgh. At Kew, the cultivar was labelled Ulmus × hollandica 'Wentworthii'. Melville dismissed the Kew specimen as Ulmus × hollandica 'Vegeta' (the lower branches of open-grown Huntingdon elms can also be pendulous), though Wentworth Elm differs strikingly in form, leaf and bark from Huntingdon. Richens and Rackham noted that examples of pendulous Ulmus × hollandica occur in the East Anglian hybridization zone.

At  RBGE, Wentworth Elm (RBGE ref. no. 32931) was identified as a hybrid of the Huntingdon Elm and Plot's Elm. A Wageningen Arboretum herbarium leaf-specimen that appears identical to 'Wentworthii' (see 'External links') was labelled U. × hollandica 'Pendula'.

Description
A tall, conspicuously pendulous tree, bell-shaped when young, domed when older. The upper leaf surface is glossy and very sparsely hairy. The petiole at <5 mm is shorter than that of Huntingdon Elm. The bark of mature trees is shallowly fissured, unlike the deeply fissured, often 'latticed' bark of Huntingdon. The tightly-clustered, apetalous wind-pollinated flowers are bright red, and appear in early spring. The seed is displaced towards the apex of the samara.

Pests and diseases
The tree is susceptible to Dutch elm disease (DED).

Cultivation
'Wentworthii Pendula' is extremely rare in cultivation. De Vos dismissed the tree as "one we can do without. As ornamentals, U. pitteurs pendula [:Zelkova × verschaffeltii ] and U. suberosa pendula [:U. 'Lombartsii' ] are far prettier, and as a (weeping) arbor U. montana pendula [:U. glabra 'Horizontalis' ] is by far the most beautiful". Späth, though he used Ulmus montana for both Wych Elm cultivars and, more rarely, for those of U. × hollandica, listed the tree from 1890 to 1902 simply as Ulmus Wentworthi pendula, then from 1903 to 1910 as a Field Elm cultivar, Ulmus campestris Wentworthi pendula or Ulmus campestris wentworthiensis, despite its hybrid leaf and samara. The tree is absent from his post-war catalogues. The specimens held at Kew Gardens and the Royal Botanic Garden Edinburgh succumbed to DED towards the end of the 20th century. The latter was one of the very few RBGE elms to keep its old cultivar name in Melville's wholesale "scientific" revision of elm nomenclature and taxonomy there in 1958. In 2016 two old plantings were discovered elsewhere in Edinburgh (see Notable Trees below), and are the only survivors known worldwide. Exported to North America, one specimen, probably sourced from Späth, was planted at the Dominion Arboretum, Ottawa, in 1897, while the tree featured in the early 20th-century catalogues of the Bobbink and Atkins nursery, Rutherford, New Jersey. The Wentworth Elm is not known to have been introduced to Australasia.

Notable trees
A third tree at Holyrood Palace was felled in 2008 due to Dutch Elm Disease and a ring count indicated an origin of approximately 1905. Despite the dearth of textbook descriptions, the trees were confidently identified as 'Wentworthii Pendula' in a RBGE survey (2016), because their leaves and branchlets match old photographs of the type and because no other large-leaved weeping hybrid elm appears in the cultivar lists of the time. Their lower branchlets 'routinely touch the ground' and are kept trimmed, as was the case with the 'Wentworthii Pendula' at the RBGE. The origin of this specimen, a much younger tree acquired in 1974 but killed by DED in 1996, is recorded only as 'Wiseman', possibly the Wiseman Nursery at Elgin, Moray.

Etymology
The tree is possibly named for Wentworth Woodhouse, the largest Classical house in Britain, or the architect of its grounds, Charles Watson-Wentworth, 2nd Marquess of Rockingham, or for the nearby Wentworth Castle. However, there is no recorded association of the tree with the estate and it may, in view of its predominant German association, have been named for Thomas Wentworth, 1st Earl of Strafford (1672–1739), Queen Anne's ambassador to the Prussian court, a much esteemed figure in Berlin during the wars with Louis XIV of France.

There is also a rare weeping ash cultivar called Wentworth, Fraxinus excelsior 'Pendula Wentworthii', though it is not known whether the name is related. Regarding the ash, Koch suggested in 1872 that 'Wentworth' may have been a corruption of 'Hepworth', the name of the vicar in Gamlingay on whose land the original 'Pendula Wentworthii' ash tree grew in the middle of the eighteenth century. The fact that the Wentworth ash appeared in print before the Wentworth elm may suggest a marketing decision of late 19th century nurseries to apply the same name to a not dissimilar tree.

Synonymy
Ulmus campestris wendworthiensis Hort.: Schelle in Beissner et al., Handbuch der Laubholz-Benennung 84. 1903.
Ulmus campestris wentworthiensis: Späth nursery, (Berlin, Germany), Cat. 143, p. 135, 1910–11.
Ulmus campestris 'Wentworthii': Dippel , Illustriertes Handbuch der Laubholzkunde, 2:24, 1892.
Ulmus wendworthii pendula: C. de Vos , Handboek, Supplement, 16, 1890.
Ulmus campestris 'Pendula': Krüssman, Gerd, Manual of Cultivated Broad-Leaved Trees & Shrubs (1984, vol. 3, p. 406)

Notes

References

External links
  Sheet labelled U. Wentworthii pendula, RBGE specimen from Späth nursery, 1902
  Sheet labelled U. Wentworthii pendula, RBGE specimen from Späth nursery, 1902
  Sheet labelled U. × hollandica 'Wentworthii Pendula' , RBGE specimen from Späth nursery, 1902 (2016 specimen 1)
  Sheet labelled U. × hollandica 'Wentworthii Pendula' , RBGE specimen from Späth nursery, 1902 (2016 specimen 2)
  Sheet labelled U. × hollandica 'Pendula' (Wageningen Arboretum specimen); appears identical to 'Wentworthii'

Dutch elm cultivar
Ulmus articles with images
Ulmus